Sdelka ili ne (Cyrillic: Сделка или не), is the Bulgarian version of Deal or No Deal, which airs on Nova Television. Players on this version can win between ten stotinki (0.10) and 100,000 leva (originally 75,000 in the first season), sometimes there is a 200,000 leva prize (with 750 leva value removed). There is also a box that contains a non-monetary object. The show was started on September 19, 2005 and has been broadcast for eleven seasons.

As of June 24, 2011, the end of the fifth season, more than 6.5 million leva had been won by 1,108 contestants, including two 75,000 leva winners and four 100,000 leva winners. The first 75,000 leva winner is Veneta Raykova (Венета Райкова), a member of the VIP Brother cast in Bulgaria. She won during the first season of the show. The other one is Aleksandar Micic (Александър Мицич) who sold his 50,000 leva box for that amount on the May 10, 2011 episode. The 100,000 leva winners include a contestant on the December 8, 2006 episode, Niki Kitaetsa (Ники Китаеца) on the September 18, 2007 episode, and Sevil Saliev (Севил Салиев) on the December 22, 2008 episode.

From the sixth season onwards, there are two more 100,000 leva winners, including Mariela Pepeldzhiyska (Мариела Пепелджийска) on the January 23, 2012 episode, and Plevenchaninat Iskren (Плевенчанинът Искрен) on the January 24, 2013 episode.

On December 25 and December 26, 2013 specials, the grand prize was increased to 500,000 leva; a contestant win 100,000 leva on December 25. On June 27, 2014 special, the grand prize was increased to 1,000,000 leva; that day the contestant win 25,000 leva.  In late January 2016 the game was taken off the air. On its place radiates Family Feud. After a one-year break, the show returns in September 2017 with the top prize of 1 kg of gold (about 68,500 leva) and is broadcast on Sundays.

Box Values (in leva)

References

External links 

Official website 

Deal or No Deal
2005 Bulgarian television series debuts
2000s Bulgarian television series
2010s Bulgarian television series
2016 Bulgarian television series endings

bg:Сделка или не